Lettmann is a German surname. Notable people with the surname include:

Ina Lettmann, German model and entrepreneur
Jochen Lettmann (born 1969), German slalom canoeist
Reinhard Lettmann (1933–2013), German Roman Catholic bishop

See also
Littmann

German-language surnames